Russia selected their Junior Eurovision entry for 2011 through national final, consisting of 20 songs. The winner was Ekaterina Ryabova with song "Kak Romeo i Dzhulyetta". Ekaterina represented Russia at the seventh edition of the contest and won second place.

Before Junior Eurovision

National final
The final which took place on 29 May 2011 at the "Akademichesky" concert hall in Moscow. The winner was determined by a 50/50 combination of jury voting and televoting.

At Junior Eurovision

Voting

Notes

References 

Junior Eurovision Song Contest
Russia
2011